Pokuru (or Nekunampuram@Pokuru)  is a village in Sri Potti Sriramulu Nellore district of the Indian state of Andhra Pradesh. It is located in Voletivaripalem mandal.

References

Villages in Prakasam district
Mandal headquarters in Prakasam district